Athens Voice was a newspaper in Athens, Georgia, USA, for the African American community. The newspaper was founded by students Fred O. Smith and Michael L. Thurmond, with the first issue was published on 12 June 1975. The paper was later published by the same company that publishes the Atlanta Voice.

References

External links 

Defunct newspapers published in Georgia (U.S. state)
Companies based in Athens, Georgia
Newspapers established in 1975
Defunct African-American newspapers
Defunct weekly newspapers
1975 establishments in Georgia (U.S. state)
African-American history of Georgia (U.S. state)